Mniotype solieri is a species of moth belonging to the family Noctuidae.

It is native to Europe.

References

Noctuidae
Moths described in 1829